Vincent van der Meer (born 11 May 1980) is a Dutch professional darts player currently playing in Professional Darts Corporation (PDC) events.

In 2017, he qualified for the 2017 Austrian Darts Open, where he defeated the English pair of Adrian Gray and Steve West, before losing to fellow Dutchman Michael van Gerwen.

He attended European Q-School in 2019, and won a two-year PDC Tour Card after finishing 4th on the Order of Merit rankings.

References

External links

1980 births
Living people
Dutch darts players
Professional Darts Corporation former tour card holders
Sportspeople from The Hague